Grandpass is a suburb in Colombo, Sri Lanka. It is part of an area known as Colombo 14.

History

During the Portuguese administration in Sri Lanka, the area was named Grande Passo. The name was anglicised during the British administration to become Grandpass. It was also known as Groote Pas, Pas Nacollegam and Pas van Goensdorp to the Dutch people.

References

Populated places in Western Province, Sri Lanka